Cet mac Mágach is a Connacht warrior in the Ulster Cycle of Irish Mythology. He had a rivalry with the Ulster warrior Conall Cernach.

In some myths, he is said to be the brother of Conall's mother, making him Conall's uncle.

At a feast at the house of Mac Dá Thó, a hospitaller of Leinster, the warriors of Connacht and Ulster competed for the champion's portion by boasting of their deeds. Cet shamed all comers by reminding them how he had bested them in combat. However, just as Cet was about to carve, Conall Cernach arrived. Conall's boasts topped even Cet's. Cet admitted defeat, but claimed that if his brother Anlúan were present, his feats would top even Conall's. Conall responded by tossing him Anlúan's freshly severed head.

Cet killed Conchobar mac Nessa, king of Ulster. He stole the calcified brain of Mesgegra, king of Leinster, which Conall Cernach had taken as a trophy of battle, and shot it from his sling, embedding it in Conchobar's head. Conchobar's doctors couldn't remove it without killing him, so they sewed up the wound and told him he would survive as long as he didn't get excited or over-exert himself. Seven reasonably peaceful years later Conchobar was told of the death of Christ. He flew into a rage, the brain burst from his head, and he died.

Cet made a raid on Ulster one winter's day, killing twenty-seven men and taking their heads. It had snowed, so Conall Cernach was able to follow his trail. He caught up with him, but was reluctant to face him until his charioteer chided him for cowardice. They met at a ford, and Conall killed Cet in a ferocious combat that left Conall near to death himself.

See also
Brain balls

Ulster Cycle